The Parker County Peach Festival is an annual event held the second Saturday of each July in Weatherford, Texas, beginning in 1985.  In addition to celebrating the peach crop from local growers, the festival also showcases local arts and crafts vendors. It is capable of drawing thousands of attendees. During the festival, vendors set up booths in the open area surrounding the Parker County Courthouse.   There is a companion bike rally event called the Peach Pedal, that serves peaches at its rest stops. There are three separate stages for entertainment including a children's stage. In previous years, there have been as many as 200 foods, craft, art, and activity booths. The festival features a “42” domino tournament.

Food 
In addition to fresh, ripe peaches, attendees can enjoy peach-based foods such as:

Peach cobbler
Peach ice cream
peach juleps
Peach smoothies
Peach pie

and typical fair foods like funnel cake, turkey legs, roasted corn, etc. The peach-themed offerings run out within the first few hours of the event

Notes

References

External links
Parker County Peach Festival
Weatherford Chamber of Commerce
Peach Pedal Bike Ride

Food and drink festivals in the United States
Tourist attractions in Parker County, Texas
Festivals in Texas
Fruit festivals